There are works that are named Pierres, pronounced like Pierre:

Pierres (novel), a novel of Victor Hugo 
Pierres (poems), a collection of poems of Roger Caillois

Pierres is the name of several communes in France:

Pierres, Calvados, in the Calvados département 
Pierres, Eure-et-Loir, in the Eure-et-Loir département

See also

Pierre (disambiguation)